The 2021–22 Albanian Women's National Championship was the 13th season of the Albanian Women's National Championship, the top Albanian women's league for association football clubs, since its establishment in 2009. The season started on 2 October 2021 and ended on 19 May 2022.

League table

Results

Top scorers

References

External links
Official website

2021–22
2021–22 domestic women's association football leagues
Women's National Championship